may refer to:
Sekigahara, Gifu, a present-day town in Gifu Prefecture, Japan
Sekigahara Station, a railway station of the town
Battle of Sekigahara, a battle in 1600 which took place in the town
Sekigahara-juku, a historical rest area of the Nakasendō, located in the town

Film
Sekigahara (film), a Japanese film